East European Film Bulletin is a not-for-profit online journal dedicated to the criticism of films related to Central, Eastern and South-Eastern Europe, published 10 times a year.

History
On 1 January 2011, in Paris, France, East European Film Bulletin was launched online. Co-founders and co-editors-in-chief are Konstanty Kuzma and Moritz Pfeifer.

See also 
 List of film periodicals

References

External links 
 East European Film Bulletin

Film magazines published in France
French film critics
English-language journals
People from Paris